In many voice telephone networks, anonymous call rejection (ACR) is a calling feature implemented in software on the network that automatically screens out calls from callers who have blocked their caller ID information.

The caller usually hears a voice message explaining that their call cannot be connected unless they display their number. Or, some networks allow users to forward anonymous calls directly to voicemail.

The service, together with caller ID, became possible with the introduction of digital switching technologies to landline telephone services, which became widespread in many countries throughout the 1980s and 1990s.

In a classic digital PSTN network, it could be implemented directly in software running on local switching systems or, more commonly, as part of a suite of facilities supported by an additional layer known as the Intelligent Network (IN). This allowed more advanced, software based, services to be rolled out in public telephone networks using dedicated intelligent  nodes, operating in conjunction with, but independently of switching systems.

As voice telephony continues evolve ACR remains available on modern and can be relatively easily implemented in VoIP based services and is also available on some mobile networks.

Some providers may include this service as standard, while others may require a subscription and others still do not offer it at all. This may be for technical reasons, but as the service is supported by most vendors, it is more likely a commercial decision.

Mobile networks often do not offer the service, as handsets (particularly smartphones) have sufficient computing power to offer advanced call filtering and logging options using their own software. They are often even able to use apps to consult databases to provide advanced information about calls, even identifying potential scams, fraudsters and nuisance calls.

Even the most basic mobile handsets usually offer the ability to mute or reject anonymous calls. In this case, software on the handset itself screens the calls, without relying on network switches. These features are activated though the phone's menus.

On more modern landline services, particularly those using VoIP, ACR is sometimes activated and deactivated using a Web interface, rather than by dialling codes.

Service usage messages 
"Your anonymous call rejection service is now on. Callers who block their number will get a recording saying you do not accept blocked calls."

"Your anonymous call rejection service is now off. Callers who block their number can now reach you."

See also 

 Automatic number identification
 Pat Fleet, the voice behind some rejection messages

References 

Caller ID
Calling features
Telephone service enhanced features